Won Tae-hee (born 13 December 1978) is a South Korean actor and film director. Won is also known as the Ha Jung-woo of independent films.

Career 
Won has been sporadically active in film and television for a decade since his debut in Sword in the Moon in 2003. However, he has become active in independent films such as My Heart Beats (2011) and Rain & Rain (2012). In 2012, he appeared as the lead in two well-received works by Lee-Song Hee-il's White Night (2012) and Lee Sang-woo's Fire in Hell (2014).

He has also started to direct his own indie films Cinema (2015) and In Another Place.

Filmography

As actor

Television series

Film

As director 
Cinema (short, 2015) 
In Another Place (TBA)

Awards and nominations

References

External links 
 
 
 

1978 births
Living people
21st-century South Korean male actors
South Korean male television actors
South Korean male film actors
South Korean film directors